The eastern wattled cuckooshrike or oriole cuckooshrike (Lobotos oriolinus) is a species of bird in the family Campephagidae.
It is found in Cameroon, Central African Republic, Republic of the Congo, Democratic Republic of the Congo, Gabon, and Nigeria.
Its natural habitat is subtropical or tropical moist lowland forest.

References

eastern wattled cuckooshrike
Birds of Central Africa
eastern wattled cuckooshrike
eastern wattled cuckooshrike
Taxonomy articles created by Polbot